Varmah is both a given name and a surname. Notable people with the name include:

Eddington Varmah, Liberian politician
Varmah Kpoto (born 1978), Liberian footballer
Varmah Sonie (born 1990), American football player

See also
Varma (surname)